Dommartin-Remiencourt is a railway station located in the commune of Dommartin near Remiencourt in the Somme department, France.  The station is served by TER Hauts-de-France trains from Creil to Amiens.  The station is at km 116.573 of the Paris-Lille Line and its elevation is 47 m.

The line was first opened on 20 June 1846 by the Compagnie du chemin de fer du Nord (Nord Railway Company). At the time trains did not stop at Dommartin-Remiencourt.

See also
List of SNCF stations in Hauts-de-France

References

Railway stations in Somme (department)
Railway stations in France opened in 1846